Sabiston is a surname. Notable people with the surname include:

Andrew Sabiston (born 1965), Canadian actor, voice actor and television writer
Bob Sabiston (born 1967), American art director and computer programmer
Carole Sabiston, Canadian textile artist
David Sabiston (1924–2009), American surgeon and cardiologist